A williwaw is a type of coastal wind.

Williwaw may also refer to:

Literature
 Williwaw (novel), a 1946 novel by Gore Vidal
 Williwaw, a 1978 novel about Labrador, Canada by Phyllis S. Moore
 Williwaw!, a 2000 children's book by Tom Bodett

Places
 5445 Williwaw, a minor planet
 Williwaw Rocks, near Joinville Island, Antarctica
 Mount Williwaw, a mountain in Alaska, US
 Williwaw Elementary, a school in the Anchorage School District, Alaska, US

Maritime
 Williwaw, a Dragon-class sailboat helmed by George Friedrichs at the 1968 Summer Olympics
 Williwaw, a Belgian yacht sailed by Willy de Roos through the Northwest Passage in 1977